Abu Bakr Muhammad b. al-Yamān al-Samarqandi was a Sunni-Hanafi scholar from Samarqand, who combined jurisprudence and theology. He paved the way for his compatriot Abu Mansur al-Maturidi (d. 333/944). He opposed the emerging Karramiyya, an anthropomorphist sect.

Works 
The sources mention the titles of four of his works:
 Kitab al-Anwar.
 Kitab al-I'tisam, was simply dedicated to hadith.
 Kitab al-Radd 'ala al-Karramiyya''', a refutation of the Karramites (al-Karramiyya). 
 Kitab Ma'alim al-Din'' ('The Lineaments of the Faith'), the title of the book would seem to present the possibility of directly accessing theological discussions. But a look at the manuscript shows that the theme of the text is completely different. It is confined strictly to argumentation on questions of law, without a single word on theology. There is a manuscript of this book in Mashhad.

Death 
Abu Bakr died in the year 268/881–2 after presumably spending his entire life in his hometown of Samarqand.

See also 
 Abu Hanifa
 Abu Mansur al-Maturidi
 Al-Hakim al-Samarqandi
 List of Hanafis
 List of Muslim theologians

References 

Hanafi fiqh scholars
Hanafis
Maturidis
Hadith scholars
9th-century Muslim theologians
People from Samarkand
Salaf
Sunni Muslim scholars of Islam
881 deaths
882 deaths